Bath is a village in Mason County, Illinois, United States. The population was 279 at the 2020 census.

Geography
Bath is in southwestern Mason County, on a low bluff overlooking the Illinois River valley to the west. Illinois Route 78 passes through the village center as Oak Street, leading northeast (upriver)  to Havana, the county seat, and south  to Chandlerville.

The East Branch of the Illinois River, a channel that forms the east side of Grand Island, serves as the northwest border of the village.

Demographics

As of the census of 2000, there were 310 people, 130 households, and 86 families residing in the village. The racial makeup of the village was 96.45% White, 0.32% African American, 0.97% Native American, and 2.26% from two or more races. Hispanic or Latino of any race were 0.32% of the population.

There were 130 households, out of which 28.5% had children under the age of 18 living with them, 46.2% were married couples living together, 16.2% had a female householder with no husband present, and 33.8% were non-families. 32.3% of all households were made up of individuals, and 10.8% had someone living alone who was 65 years of age or older. The average household size was 2.38 and the average family size was 2.95.

In the village, the population was spread out, with 27.4% under the age of 18, 8.7% from 18 to 24, 25.5% from 25 to 44, 23.2% from 45 to 64, and 15.2% who were 65 years of age or older. The median age was 34 years. For every 100 females, there were 96.2 males. For every 100 females age 18 and over, there were 89.1 males.

The median income for a household in the village was $30,208, and the median income for a family was $31,875. Males had a median income of $27,250 versus $18,750 for females. The per capita income for the village was $10,262. About 22.2% of families and 24.7% of the population were below the poverty line, including 37.7% of those under the age of eighteen and 3.2% of those 65 or over.

Events
Bath is host to the annual midsummer Redneck Fishing Tournament.

Notable people 

 Mark Clark, pitcher for several Major League Baseball teams; grew up in Bath

References

Villages in Mason County, Illinois
Villages in Illinois